This is a list of schools in Redcar and Cleveland, in the English county of North Yorkshire.

State-funded schools

Primary schools

Badger Hill Academy, Brotton
Bankfields Primary School, Eston
Belmont Primary School, Guisborough
Caedmon Primary School, Grangetown
Chaloner Primary School, Guisborough
Coatham CE Primary School, Redcar
Dormanstown Primary Academy, Dormanstown
Errington Primary School, Marske-by-the-Sea
Galley Hill Primary School, Guisborough
Grangetown Primary School, Grangetown
Green Gates Primary School, Redcar
Handale Primary School, Loftus
Highcliffe Primary School, Guisborough
Hummersea Primary School, Loftus
Ings Farm Primary School, Redcar
John Emmerson Batty Primary School, Redcar
Lakes Primary School, Redcar
Lingdale Primary School, Lingdale
Lockwood Primary School, Boosbeck
New Marske Primary School, New Marske
Newcomen Primary School, Redcar
Normanby Primary School, Normanby
Nunthorpe Primary Academy, Nunthorpe
Ormesby Primary School, Ormesby
Overfields Primary School, Ormesby
Riverdale Primary School, Redcar
St Bede's RC Primary School, Marske-by-the-Sea
St Benedict's RC Primary School, Redcar
St Gabriel's RC Primary School, Ormesby
St Joseph's RC Primary School, Loftus
St Margaret Clitherow's RC Primary School, South Bank
St Mary's RC Primary School, Grangetown
St Paulinus RC Primary School, Guisborough
St Peter's CE Primary School, Brotton
Saltburn Primary School, Saltburn-by-the-Sea
Skelton Primary School, Skelton-in-Cleveland
South Bank Community Primary School, South Bank
Teesville Academy, Teesville
Westgarth Primary School, Marske-by-the-Sea
Whale Hill Primary School, Eston
Wheatlands Primary School, Redcar
Whitecliffe Academy, Carlin How
Wilton Primary Academy, Lazenby
Zetland Primary School, Redcar

Secondary schools

Freebrough Academy, Saltburn-by-the-Sea
Huntcliff School, Saltburn-by-the-Sea
Laurence Jackson School, Guisborough
Nunthorpe Academy, Nunthorpe
Outwood Academy Bydales, Marske-by-the-Sea
Outwood Academy Normanby, South Bank
Outwood Academy Redcar, Redcar
Rye Hills Academy, Redcar
Sacred Heart Catholic Secondary, Redcar
St Peter's Catholic College, South Bank

Special and alternative schools
Archway Academy, Teesville
Kilton Thorpe Specialist Academy, Brotton
Kirkleatham Hall School, Kirkleatham
Mo Mowlam Academy, Redcar
River Tees Academy Grangetown, Grangetown

Further education
Prior Pursglove College
Redcar & Cleveland College

Independent schools

Special and alternative schools
Invested Education, Marske-by-the-Sea
Mackenzie Thorpe Centre, South Bank
Old Farm School, Brotton
Outwood Alternative Provision Eston, Eston
Progress Schools - Tees Valley, Eston

Redcar and Cleveland
Schools in Redcar and Cleveland
Schools